Dr. James E. Waller is a widely recognized scholar in the field of Holocaust and genocide studies, and the inaugural Cohen Professor of Holocaust and Genocide Studies at Keene State College located in Keene, New Hampshire.

At Keene State College and within the Cohen Center for Holocaust and Genocide Studies, Dr. Waller teaches courses primarily focused on genocide and comparative genocide. Dr. Waller was previously a Professor of Psychology at Whitworth University, in Spokane, Washington, and was the Edward B. Lindaman Chair from Fall 2003-2007. He has also held visiting research professorships at the Technical University of Berlin in Berlin, Germany (1990), the Catholic University of Eichstätt-Ingolstadt in Eichstatt, Germany (1992), and in the George J. Mitchell Institute for Global Peace, Justice and Security at Queen’s University Belfast in Belfast, Northern Ireland (2017). He also directs, and teaches in, Keene State’s annual Summer Institute on Genocide Studies and Prevention.

In addition to being an educator, Dr. Waller is also regularly involved in the policy-making arena with his role as Director of Academic Programs with the Auschwitz Institute for the Prevention of Genocide and Mass Atrocities (AIPG), as the curriculum developer and lead instructor for the Rahael Lemkin Seminar for Genocide Prevention.

Within AIPG, Dr. Waller educates and trains in genocide prevention for the US Army Command and General Staff College at Fort Leavenworth, Kansas. Dr. Waller also has delivered briefings on genocide prevention and perpetrator behavior for the U.S. Department of State’s Bureau of Intelligence and Research, the CIA Directorate of Intelligence, and the International Human Rights Unit of the FBI.

Biography
Waller has led teacher training in Holocaust and genocide studies for the Washington State Holocaust Education Resource Center (2009 and 2012), the North Carolina Center for the Advancement of Teaching (2010), the U.S. Holocaust Memorial Museum (2010-2012, 2015), and the Zoryan Institute (2015 and 2016). In addition, he has consulted on exhibition development with the National Institute for Holocaust Education at the United States Holocaust Memorial Museum (USHMM) and the Kigali Genocide Memorial Centre in Rwanda. His fieldwork has included research in Germany, Israel, Northern Ireland, the former Yugoslavia, Rwanda, Uganda, Tanzania, Argentina, Chile, and Guatemala.

During 1999-2000, Dr. Waller was one of sixteen national recipients of the prestigious Pew Fellowship Award to continue his work on the psychology of human evil. In June 2007, he received the “First Voice Humanitarian Award” from the Chicago Center for Urban Life & Culture in recognition of his work in connecting students with urban communities, particularly communities in need. In November 2011, Waller was recognized by a California Senate Resolution for “his tireless efforts to end genocide.”  In 2012, he was Keene State College’s institutional nominee for the Joseph B. and Toby Gittler Prize from Brandeis University, an award given in recognition of scholarly contributions to racial, ethnic, and/or religious relations. Dr. Waller was appointed as the Centennial Global Ethics Fellow of the Carnegie Council for Ethics in International Affairs for 2013-2014. Most recently, in September 2015, he was named a Peace Ambassador by the Center for Peacebuilding in Sanski Most, Bosnia-Herzegovina.

Waller is widely recognized for his work on intergroup relations and prejudice, and in 1996 developed a study program titled "Prejudice Across America." The program drew national media attention and was named by President Bill Clinton's Initiative on Race as one of America's "Promising Practices for Racial Reconciliation." Many of the experiences from the study program are chronicled in Dr. Waller's first book, Face to Face: The Changing State of Racism Across America; and in a second book, Prejudice Across America.

In addition to six books, Dr. Waller has published more than thirty articles in peer-reviewed professional journals, contributed over twenty chapters in edited books, and is a co-editor of Historical Dialogue and the Prevention of Mass Atrocities. His book on perpetrators of genocide, Becoming Evil: How Ordinary People Commit Genocide and Mass Killing, was praised by Publishers Weekly for “clearly and effectively synthesizing a wide range of studies to develop an original and persuasive model of the process by which people can become evil.”  In addition to being used as a textbook in college and university courses around the world, Becoming Evil also was short-listed for the biennial Raphael Lemkin Book Award from the Institute for the Study of Genocide.  Concepts from Becoming Evil, released in a revised and updated second edition in 2007, have been the basis for an international best-selling novel (The Exception by Christian Jungersen) and a play workshopped in the School of Theater, Film, and Television at UCLA. His research on perpetrator behavior also is featured in Eduardo Rufeisen’s award-winning documentary The Evil Within (2016). Waller’s fifth book, Confronting Evil: Engaging Our Responsibility to Prevent Genocide, has been hailed as “a well-written…immensely valuable contribution to the field of genocide studies.” His sixth book, A Troubled Sleep: Risk and Resilience in Contemporary Northern Ireland has been praised as a “model for scholarship on contemporary issues.”

Dr. Waller received his B.S. (1983) from Asbury University (KY), M.S. (1985) from the University of Colorado, and Ph.D. in Social Psychology (1988) from the University of Kentucky. He also has completed additional certification work in safety and security after violent conflict at the Queen’s University of Belfast, Northern Ireland. He is an active member of the International Association of Genocide Scholars (for which he served as the program chair at the eighth biennial meeting in 2009 and is currently a member of the Advisory Board) as well as the International Network of Genocide Scholars.  Dr. Waller also serves on the board of the Journal for the Study of Antisemitism, as an editor-in-chief for Genocide Studies and Prevention, and is an Honorary Member of the International Expert Team of the Institute for Research of Genocide Canada.

Dr. Waller lectures and speaks on Holocaust and genocide studies, intergroup relations, and prejudice for academic, professional, and public audiences. He has lectured at more than 50 colleges and universities, and is frequently interviewed by media sources such as PBS, CNN, CBC, the Los Angeles Times, the Washington Post, Salon, and the New York Times.

Bibliography
 Face to Face: The Changing State of Racism Across America. (Perseus Books, 1998) 
 Prejudice Across America (University Press of Mississippi, 2000) 
 Becoming Evil: How Ordinary People Commit Genocide and Mass Killing. (Oxford University Press 2002) 1st Edition.
 Becoming Evil: How Ordinary People Commit Genocide and Mass Killing. (Oxford University Press 2007) 2nd Edition. 
 Confronting Evil: Engaging Our Responsibility to Prevent Genocide (Oxford University Press, 2016)
 A Troubled Sleep: Risk and Resilience in Contemporary Northern Ireland (Oxford University Press, 2021)

References

Year of birth missing (living people)
Living people
Asbury University alumni
Genocide studies
Holocaust studies
Keene State College faculty
University of Colorado alumni
University of Kentucky alumni